Cafe Chambord was an American restaurant that served French haute cuisine. Its original owner was Roger Chauveron who opened it in 1936 then sold it in 1950 to move to Deviat Charente, France.

History
The Chambord was opened in 1936. It was located at 803 Third Avenue before moving to 5 East 55th Street in 1963; it closed in August 1964.

Ownership

By the mid-1950s, the Chambord was co-owned by Henry Margolis, a New York entrepreneur and theatrical producer, and his partner Phil Rosen, who ran the restaurant on a daily basis.  Margolis was often seen there entertaining theatrical friends like Orson Welles, Joseph Cotten, Margaret Sullavan and Martin Gabel.

See also
 List of French restaurants

References

Further reading
 Markets and Menus, The New Yorker, March 30, 1957, p. 106. Describes the Chambord's new frozen food line.
 Chambord at Cote Basque Is Closed, The New York Times, August 13, 1964, p. 19. "Le Cafe Chambord at La Côte Basque, one of the most elegant restaurants in Manhattan, has closed its doors."

Defunct restaurants in New York City
French-American culture in New York City
Restaurants established in 1936
Defunct French restaurants in the United States